Clubul Sportiv Făurei, commonly known as CS Făurei, or simply as Făurei, is a Romanian amateur football club based in Făurei, Brăila County, founded in 2002. The club is currently playing in the Liga IV.

Owner, manager and also player of the team is former Romanian international Bănel Nicoliță.

History 
CS Făurei was founded on 22 March 2002 to continue the football tradition in the town, football tradition started by Unirea Făurei, team that had as the best performance two consecutive seasons in the Divizia C, in the early 1990s.

Făurei is an important railway node in Romania, the 5th in the country according to the number of connections with other localities, of which three double, electrified lines. In the immediate vicinity and partly on its administrative territory is located the largest railway ring in South-Eastern Europe, inaugurated in the 1970s. Despite its important role in the transportation, Făurei is not an economical force in Romania, being ninth smallest city and the football team was also mainly a fourth tier team, even in the time of communism. After the dissolution of the historical team, Unirea, CS Făurei continued to play in the Liga IV reaching only meteorically Liga III, in the 2000s. 

In 2016 Bănel Nicoliță, former player of Steaua București, Saint-Étienne or FC Nantes, among others, who is originally from Făurei, took over the club with the objective to promote back in the Liga III. After a first season in which "the white and blues" were ranked only 2nd, CS Făurei won Liga IV – Brăila County series, went to the promotion play-off, where after a 7–4 on aggregate against CSU Galați, promoted back in the Liga III, after an absence of 12 years.

Grounds

CS Făurei plays its home matches on Orășenesc Stadium in Făurei, Brăila County, with a capacity of 1,000 seats.

Honours
Liga IV – Brăila County
Winners (2): 2004–05, 2017–18
Runners-up (1): 2016–17

Cupa României – Brăila County
Winners (1): 2017–18
Runners-up (1): 2016–17

Unirea Făurei
Liga IV – Brăila County
Winners (1): 1989–90

Players

First team squad

Out on loan

Club Officials

Board of directors

Current technical staff

League history

References

External links

CS Făurei at AJF Brăila

Association football clubs established in 2002
Football clubs in Brăila County
Liga III clubs
Liga IV clubs
2002 establishments in Romania